Bowdertown, Pennsylvania is a populated place in Indiana County, with an elevation of 1,610 feet (491 m).

References

Unincorporated communities in Pennsylvania